Niyaz Bilalov born 5 September 1994) is a Russian judoka

He is the gold medallist of the 2017 Judo Grand Slam Abu Dhabi in the -100 kg category.

References

External links
 

1994 births
Living people
Russian male judoka
Universiade medalists in judo
Universiade silver medalists for Russia
Universiade bronze medalists for Russia
Medalists at the 2015 Summer Universiade
Medalists at the 2017 Summer Universiade